David Pratt is a Scottish author, filmmaker, photographer, and journalist who has been named Scottish Journalist of the Year, Reporter of the Year, and Feature Writer of the Year.

Pratt is known for his war reporting and photography, which was featured in the 2020 documentary Pictures from Afghanistan and the 2022 documentary Pictures from Iraq. He is the author of Intifada – The Long Day of Rage.

Early life and education 
Pratt grew up in a working-class family in the impoverished Hillhouse scheme near Hamilton. As a teenager he was a keen mountaineer.

He has an honours arts degree from the Glasgow School of Art.

Career 
After graduation, Pratt briefly taught art and design history before starting his journalism career. Pratt has reported on wars in Afghanistan, Bosnia, Cambodia, the Democratic Republic of the Congo, and Haiti; he has reported on the Iranian revolution, Iraq, Libya, the Nicaraguan revolution, and events in Gaza, Russia, Somalia, Sudan, and Syria. He is most known for his reporting being published by The Herald, but has also reported for Agence France Presse, Al-Jazeera, the BBC, Channel 4 News, The National, The New York Times, Reuters, Svenska Dagbladet, The Daily Telegraph, The Independent, Sunday National, and The Sunday Times.

In 2019, he exhibited his war photography at the exhibition Only With the Heart.

His work was featured in the 2020 documentary Pictures from Afghanistan and the 2022 documentary Pictures from Iraq that he co-directed with Robbie Fraser. Pratt is the presenter of Pictures from The Balkans, directed by Fraser and broadcast on the BBC in 2022 and 2023. In Pictures from The Balkans, Pratt revisits locations he filmed in during the Yugoslav Wars travelling along the Danube River near Vukovar, Croatia. Pratt also features in the 2023 BBC Scotland two-part documentary Pictures from Ukraine. Also produced by Robbie Fraser, Pictures from Ukraine documents Pratt's 2022 journey from Poland to Mykolaiv via Kyiv and Lviv, during the Russo-Ukrainian war. In 2022, Pratt held a photography exhibition Sogo Community Arts Hub on the Saltmarket, also called Pictures from Ukraine.

Selected publications 

 David Pratt, 2007, Intifada – The Long Day of Rage, ISBN 978-1932033632

Awards 

 Amnesty International Media Awards for human rights reporting, four times finalist
 Journalist of the Year, Scottish Press Awards, 2019
 Reporter of the Year, Scottish Press Awards, twice
 Feature Writer of the Year, Scottish Press Awards, twice

References

External links 

 David Pratt - Twitter

BBC newsreaders and journalists
The Herald (Glasgow) people
Scottish journalists
Living people
War correspondents
Agence France-Presse journalists
Al Jazeera people
The New York Times people
Reuters people
The Independent people
Year of birth missing (living people)
War correspondents of the Gulf War
War correspondents of the War in Afghanistan (2001–2021)
War correspondents of the Balkan Wars
War correspondents of the Syrian civil war
21st-century Scottish writers
Scottish filmmakers
Alumni of the Glasgow School of Art